Theriella is a genus of South American jumping spiders that was first described by A. Braul & A. A. Lise in 1996.  it contains only three species, found only in Argentina and Brazil: T. bertoncelloi, T. galianoae, and T. tenuistyli. T. tenuistyla was moved from Yepoella when this genus was erected.

References

Salticidae genera
Salticidae
Spiders of Argentina
Spiders of Brazil